= Ipsden Heath =

Coordinates: 51.561°N 1.042°W

Ipsden Heath is a 32-acre (13-hectare) woodland in the English county of Oxfordshire, within the Chiltern Area of Outstanding Natural Beauty.
